HD 181720 is an 8th-magnitude G-type main sequence star located approximately 190 light-years away in the constellation Sagittarius. This star is larger, hotter, brighter and less massive than the Sun. Also its metal content is three-tenths as much as the Sun. 

The star HD 181720 is named Sika. The name was selected in the NameExoWorlds campaign by Ghana, during the 100th anniversary of the IAU. Sika means gold in the Ewe language.

Planetary system
In 2009, a gas giant planet was found in orbit around the star. It was named "Toge" in 2019. The planets around such metal-poor stars are rare (only two known similar cases are HD 111232 and HD 22781).

See also 
 HD 5388
 HD 190984
 Lists of exoplanets

References

G-type main-sequence stars
181720
095262
CD-33 14164
Sagittarius (constellation)
Planetary systems with one confirmed planet
J19225298-3255079